Reem Alasadi is an Iraqi-born British fashion designer. She is based in both London and Tokyo, and is very popular in Japan, with her style being described as "British punk and recycled materials molded into voluminous and voluptuous Victorian-inspired dresses".

Early life and career 
Born in Iraq and of Arab origin, Reem was raised in London, England, and at the age of sixteen, she was working for Karen Millen in Kent.

Alasadi was accepted to London College of Fashion and Central Saint Martins College of Art and Design and by the age of 21 she had set up her first label and a  studio.

At the start of her career, Reem had sold top of the range vintage clothing in Notting Hill. Her stall was at Portobello road market, where she would practice her flair for displaying classic pieces restyled thus widening the appeal of the garment to more than just collectors of vintage fashion. 
Reem is renowned for her wildly eclectic style which combined a growing underground reputation. She has worked with several British designers such as John Richmond, Robert Cary-Williams, and Stella McCartney.

In 2003, she opened her own vintage shop, and has collaborated with Laforet, a department store in Harajuku as part of Tokyo Fashion week since 2005.

In 2007, she entered the London Fashion Week arena with a show entitled Beautiful Agony as part of ON||OFF.

She recently won an award for Best Show at Japan Fashion Week, where she recently launched her ready-to-wear line, which is a unique collection of deep inky blues, burnt siennas and lacey whites.

References

External links 
 Official Site

Living people
Year of birth missing (living people)
Iraqi fashion designers
Iraqi women fashion designers
High fashion brands
Iraqi emigrants to the United Kingdom
British women artists
British artists
Iraqi contemporary artists
Iraqi women artists
British fashion designers
British women fashion designers